Bon Jovi is a U.S. rock band.

Bon Jovi may also refer to:

 Bon Jovi (album), 1984 debut album released by the eponymous band Bon Jovi
 Jon Bon Jovi (born 1962), U.S. musician and lead singer of the band Bon Jovi
 Valentino Bon Jovi Bong (born 1989), Malaysian squash player

See also

 
 Bongiovi (surname), also spelled as "Bon Jovi"
 Bon (disambiguation)
 Jovi (disambiguation)